Richard Ike Sutton (April 5, 1915 – June 30, 2001) was an American politician. He served as a member of the Hawaii House of Representatives.

Life and career 
Sutton was born in Honolulu, Hawaii. He attended Punahou School and Stanford Law School. He served in the United States Marine Corps.

In 1962, Sutton was a Republican candidate for the Hawaii's at-large district of the United States House of Representatives.

In 1974, Sutton was elected to the Hawaii House of Representatives, serving until 1980. In 1994, he was a candidate for lieutenant governor of Hawaii.

Sutton died in June 2001, at the age of 86.

References 

1915 births
2001 deaths
Politicians from Honolulu
Hawaii Republicans
Members of the Hawaii House of Representatives
20th-century American politicians
Stanford Law School alumni

Year of birth missing